The Hungary national korfball team is managed by the Magyar Korfball Szövetség (MKS), representing Hungary in korfball international competitions.

Tournament history

Current squad
National team in the 2010 European Championship

References

External links
 Magyar Korfball Szövetség

National korfball teams
Korfball
National team